HMNZS Kiwi (P3554) was a Moa-class inshore patrol vessel of the Royal New Zealand Navy. It was commissioned in 1983 for the Naval Volunteer Reserve. Kiwi had been attached to the Christchurch division of the Naval Volunteer Reserve from her commissioning until relocating to Auckland in 2006.

Kiwi was the second ship of this name to serve in the Royal New Zealand Navy and is named after the national bird of New Zealand.

See also 
 Patrol boats of the Royal New Zealand Navy

References

Moa-class patrol boats